The Gloucestershire Rugby Football Union is the union responsible for rugby union in the county of Gloucestershire, England and is one of the constituent bodies of the national Rugby Football Union. Formed in 1878, it has won the county championship on numerous occasions.

History
The Union was formed at a meeting held at Gloucester in September, 1878. At that meeting, the clubs represented were Clifton RFC, Gloucester RFC, Royal Agricultural College, Cirencester RFC, Rockleage, Stroud, and Cheltenham White Cross. The Union was formed mainly due to the efforts of J. D. Miller, J. H. Dunn, and J. F. Brown. all of whom were amongst the Union's first officers. For many years, the playing strength depended almost entirely on the Clifton and Gloucester Clubs. In the first five seasons the Union side only lost two of seventeen fixtures in Inter-County matches. The RFU recognised its success by electing in 1880 J. D. Miller to represent the West of England on the central executive. Ironically, the representative side then went through a period in which they had a very poor record. From 1883 to 1889 the team played only 10 times and of these 6 were lost, 3 drawn, and only 1 won. It was noted that the fortunes of the county side mirrored the success of the Gloucester City club side. When the Gloucester City side revived in the early 1890s, so to did the County, and in the seasons 1889-90, 1890–91, 1891–92, Gloucestershire lost two matches only.

In the first year of the County Championship (1890–91) Gloucestershire were the winners in the South-Western group, but when they entered the second phase, they were crushed by Lancashire.

County side

Honours

From 1984 all Championship finals were played at Twickenham.

Notable players for the County side

Many notable players have represented the county.

British and Irish Lions
John Gordon A'Bear
Mike Teague
Mike Burton
England internationals
J. A. Bush
W. 0. Moberly
H. C. Baker
Wales internationals
S. H. Nicholls
W. Watts
G. Rowles
Scotland internationals
H. L. Evans (Clifton)
H.F. Chambers (Cheltenham)
D. Hilton (Clifton)

Affiliated clubs
Formed by Clifton RFC, Gloucester RFC, Royal Agricultural College, Cirencester RFC, Rockleage, Stroud, and Cheltenham White Cross, by 1891, the Union consisted of ten clubs, viz.,
Gloucester, Clifton, Royal Agricultural College, Cirencester, Bristol, Cheltenham, Lydney, Sharpness, Dursley, Stroud, and Gordon Wanderers (Gloucester). In its early days, only Gloucester City was rated as a first class side, and this was deemed the county's weakness. Since then, the fortunes of the constituent clubs has varied enormously.

Today there are 74 clubs affiliated with the Gloucestershire RFU, most of which have teams at both senior and junior level.  Geographically, most clubs in the RFU are from Gloucestershire or Bristol, although several teams are based in bordering counties such as Somerset.  In turn clubs are affiliated with one of the five combinations – Bristol, Cheltenham, Forest of Dean, North Gloucestershire and Stroud – that make up the Gloucestershire RFU.

7 Bamboos 
Aretians (Bristol)
Ashley Down Old Boys (Bristol)
Avonmouth Old Boys (Bristol)
Barton Hill (Bristol)
Berry Hill (Forest of Dean)
Bishopston (Bristol)
Bream (Forest of Dean)
Bristol Aeroplane Co. (Bristol)
Bristol Bears (Bristol)
Bristol Bisons (Bristol)
Bristol Saracens (Bristol)
Bristol Telephone Area (Bristol)
Broad Plain (Bristol)
Brockworth (North Gloucestershire)
Cheltenham (Cheltenham)
Cheltenham Civil Service (Cheltenham)
Cheltenham North (Cheltenham)
Cheltenham Saracens (Cheltenham)
Chipping Sodbury (Bristol)
Chosen Hill Former Pupils (North Gloucestershire)
Cinderford (Forest of Dean)
Cirencester (Stroud)
Cleve (Bristol)
Clifton (Bristol)
Coney Hill (North Gloucestershire)
Cotham Park (Bristol)
Dings Crusaders (Bristol)
Dowty (North Gloucestershire)
Drybrook (Forest of Dean)
Dursley (Stroud)
Fairford (Stroud)
Frampton Cotterell (Bristol)
Gloucester All Blues (North Gloucestershire)
Gloucester Old Boys (North Gloucestershire)
Gloucester Rugby
Gloucestershire Constabulary (Cheltenham)
Gordon League (North Gloucestershire)
Hardwicke & Quedgeley Harlequins (North Gloucestershire)
Hartpury College
Hucclecote (North Gloucestershire)
Kingswood (Bristol)
Longlevens (North Gloucestershire)
Lydney (Forest of Dean)
Matson (North Gloucestershire)
Minchinhampton (Stroud)
Newent (Forest of Dean)
North Bristol (Bristol)
Norton (Cheltenham)
Old Bristolians (Bristol)
Old Centralians (North Gloucestershire)
Old Cryptians (North Gloucestershire)
Old Elizabethans (Bristol)
Old Patesians (Cheltenham)
Old Richians (North Gloucestershire)
Painswick (Stroud)
Royal Agricultural University (Stroud)
Smiths (Industries) (Cheltenham)
Southmead (Bristol)
Spartans (North Gloucestershire)
St Mary's Old Boys (Bristol)
Stow-on-the-Wold (Cheltenham)
Stroud (Stroud)
Tetbury (Stroud)
Tewkesbury (Cheltenham)
The Peeler (Bristol)
Thornbury (Bristol)
United Bristol Hospitals 
University of Bristol (Bristol)
University of Gloucestershire  
University of the West of England   
Whitehall (Bristol)
Widden Old Boys (North Gloucestershire)
Wotton (Stroud)

County club competitions 

The Gloucester RFU currently runs the following club competitions for club sides in Gloucestershire and parts of Bristol:

Leagues

Gloucester Premier – league for clubs at tier 8 of the English rugby union system between tiers 5-11
Gloucester 1 – league for Gloucestershire sides at tier 9
Gloucester 2 North – regional league for Gloucestershire sides at tier 10
Gloucester 2 South – regional league for Gloucestershire sides at tier 11

Discontinued leagues:
Gloucester 3 - tier 11/12 league that ran between 1987–2017
Gloucester 4 - tier 12/13 league that ran between 1987–1996

Cups

Although in the past there has been a cup covering the whole of the county, Gloucestershire currently has competitions for each of the five affiliated bodies that make up the Gloucestershire RFU.  These are as follows:

Bristol Combination
 Bristol Cup – founded in 1970 for club sides in and around Bristol at tiers 4-6 of the English rugby union system
 Bristol Vase – founded in 2003 for clubs at tiers 7-8
 Bristol Cyril Parsons Bowl – founded in 2012 for clubs sides at tiers 9-11

Cheltenham Combination
Cheltenham Cup

Forest of Dean Combination
Forest of Dean Cup

North Gloucestershire Combination
North Gloucestershire Senior Cup – founded in 1903 for club sides based in Gloucester and north Gloucestershire between tiers 5-11
North Gloucestershire Junior Cup – founded in 1913 for 2nd teams
North Gloucestershire Glanville Cup – founded in 1975 for 3rd teams

Stroud & District Combination
Stroud & District Senior Cup – founded in 1974 for club sides based in Stroud District between tiers 7-11
Stroud & District Junior Cup – founded in 1976, primarily for 2nd teams
Stroud & District Bill Adams Cup – founded in 1980, primarily for 3rd teams

See also
South West Division
English rugby union system

Notes

References

Rugby union governing bodies in England
1878 establishments in England
Sports organizations established in 1878
Rugby union in Gloucestershire